The Popatlal Dhanjinbhai Malaviya College of Commerce or PDMCC is a college affiliated with Saurashtra University. PDMCC is in Rajkot, Gujarat, India.

Campus

The main campus is located on Gondal Road in south Rajkot. It has facilities such as a gym, sports ground, NCC, and NSS.

Academic departments
 Commerce
 Management

References

External links
 

Commerce colleges in India
Universities and colleges in Gujarat
Education in Rajkot
Educational institutions established in 1957
1957 establishments in Bombay State